James Bonwick (8 July 1817 – 6 February 1906) was an English-born Australian historical and educational writer.

Early life
Bonwick was born Lingfield, Surrey, England, the eldest son of James Bonwick, carpenter, and his second wife Mary Ann née Preston. James Bonwick, the elder, was a man of some mechanical ability, but he suffered from ill health, and his children were brought up in poor circumstances. His eldest son was educated at the Borough Road school, Southwark, and at 17 years of age began teaching at a school at Hemel Hempstead and similar positions followed at Bexley and Liverpool. In April 1840 he married Esther Ann Beddow, the daughter of a Baptist clergyman, and in the following year obtained a position at the Normal School, Hobart, Tasmania.

Career in Australia

Teacher 
Bonwick and his wife arrived at Hobart on 10 October 1841. He was a successful teacher in Hobart for eight years and published the first of his many school books Geography for the Use of Australian Youth in 1845. He went to Adelaide in 1850, and opened a private school. In 1852 made his way to the Victorian gold diggings after finding himself in debt. He did not find much gold, but his health benefited. He then went to Melbourne where he published The Australian Gold-Diggers' Monthly Magazine from October 1852 until its final edition in May 1853.  In 1852 he also published "Notes of a gold digger: and gold digger's guide". He then established a successful boarding school at Kew now a suburb of Melbourne. He had already published several school books and pamphlets, when in 1856 he published his Discovery and Settlement of Port Phillip, the first of his historical works. About this time he joined the Victorian government service as an inspector of denominational schools, and in 1857 made a tour of inspection through the western district of Victoria. He then made Ballarat his centre and worked there for about four years. During his journeys he suffered from sunstroke and a coaching accident, and became so ill that he had to retire from the service. He was given 18 months' leave of absence, but was unable to continue this work. His head had been injured in the accident. He was never able to ride a horse again, and he was always liable to have an attack of giddiness. He visited England in 1860 and then returned to Melbourne in July 1862 and opened a school in the suburb of St Kilda, which became very prosperous. He paid another visit to England with his wife, leaving the school in the hands of a son and a friend of his. They, however, mismanaged the school, and Bonwick was compelled to return and put things in order again. He was doing much writing, and in the ensuing years travelled in various parts of Australia, New Zealand and Europe.

Author 
Bonwick's initial works drew on his experience as a teacher and later of the Victorian gold diggings. He extended his repertoire, focusing on the history of Colonial Australia and religious subjects. Some of Bonwick's more important volumes were John Batman (1867); The Last of the Tasmanians, Daily Life and Origin of the Tasmanians, and Curious Facts of Old Colonial Days, all of which were published in 1870; Egyptian Belief and Modern Thought (1878), First Twenty Years of Australia (1882), Port Phillip Settlement (1883), Romance of the Wool Trade (1887) and Irish Druids and Old Irish Religions (1894).

Archivist 
James Bonwick began examining historical records of Australian interest in London in 1884 and in 1887 he was authorised by the New South Wales Colonial Secretary, Sir Henry Parkes to transcribe Governors’ despatches from the Public Record Office as part of a drive to collect records for an official centenary history of New South Wales.

Bonwick was appointed archivist for the New South Wales government in 1888 and continued until 1902. He compiled what became known as the Bonwick Transcripts. These handwritten transcripts of records held in the Public Record Office, London (now The National Archives) were published in the series Historical Records of New South Wales (1892-1901).

Later life 
In 1900 he had celebrated with his wife the sixtieth anniversary of their wedding. She died in 1901 and he felt her loss keenly. He completed and published in 1902 his final volume, an autobiography, An Octogenarian's Reminiscences, and died on 6 February 1906. He was survived by five children.

Legacy
Bonwick was a religious man, full of nervous energy and passion for his work. History, religion, astronomy, geography, anthropology and trade were among the subjects of his books. Some of the more important have been mentioned, some fifty others are listed in "A Bibliography of James Bonwick" by Dr G. Mackaness (Journal and Proceedings, Royal Australian Historical Society, 1937). An even longer list of his writings is appended to James Bonwick by E. E. Pescott. His school books were of great value at a time when it was difficult to obtain suitable books in Australia, and his historical work was always conscientious.

Bonwick is best remembered for his transcripts of British Government records that formed the basis of the reference work: Historical Records of New South Wales. These records were his principal work until in 1902, at the age of 85, he resigned his position.

It is true that Bonwick's transcripts and the resulting 7 volumes of Historical Records of New South Wales received later criticism. His selections were arbitrary and he was accused of censorship and excluding material that reflected poorly on individuals whether government officials, the military and free settlers, or drew attention to convict origins.

However, these transcripts and publications had great utilitarian value for researchers, students and general readers who had no chance of seeing the original documents in Britain. Eventually the National Library of Australia and the State Library of New South Wales were to approach the Public Record Office with requests to microfilm these records comprehensively. This ultimately led to the two libraries signing an agreement with the PRO to establish the Australian Joint Copying Project (AJCP).

The Bonwick Transcripts were transferred to the Mitchell Library when it was founded in 1910 as the "Australiana" Wing of the Library.

In 1856, the Victorian government botanist Ferdinand von Mueller, named Euodia bonwickii (now Melicope bonwickii) in his honour.

See also 

 Australian Joint Copying Project

References

Further reading

External links

1817 births
1906 deaths
Australian memoirists
English emigrants to Australia
19th-century Australian historians
19th-century memoirists